Calvin Galusha Coolidge (September 22, 1815 – December 15, 1878) was an American farmer and politician.

Background 
Coolidge was born in Plymouth, Vermont. His parents were Calvin Coolidge (1780–1853) and Sarah Thompson (1789–1856). Coolidge was a farmer. He served in local government as a justice of the peace, constable, and selectman. He served in the Vermont House of Representatives in 1860 and 1861. He was the father of John Calvin Coolidge Sr., who also served in the Vermont General Assembly, and the grandfather of Calvin Coolidge, the 30th President of the United States. He died in Plymouth, Vermont, at the age of 63.

Notes

External links 

1815 births
1878 deaths
People from Plymouth, Vermont
Members of the Vermont House of Representatives
Farmers from Vermont
Calvin Coolidge
Coolidge family
19th-century American politicians
Burials in Vermont